Edward J Wormley (December 31, 1907 – November 3, 1995) was an American designer of modern furniture. In 1926 he went to study briefly at the Art Institute of Chicago. Funds ran out and he went to work as an interior designer for Marshall Fields & Company department store. During the Depression, Wormley was introduced to the president of Dunbar Furniture Company of Berne, Indiana, who hired him to upgrade their product line.

Working with Dunbar
Dunbar made a good choice, as Wormley's work met with immediate success. In 1944 the company decided to focus strictly on Modern lines, and Edward Wormley rose to the task, incorporating European and Scandinavian innovations.

His eye for quality and the exacting craftsmanship at Dunbar made for furniture that was elegant, understated and exceptionally well-made. Wormley was never really at the forefront of Modern design. Instead, he took the best elements from classical, historical design and translated them into Modern vernacular. The result was furniture that was sophisticated, yet mainstream and very successful.

Good Design Exhibitions

Wormley's inclusion in the Good Design Exhibitions staged by the Museum of Modern Art and the Merchandise Mart between 1950 and 1955 elevated him to a respected place alongside more cutting edge designers like Bertoia, Nelson and Eames. Wormley understood the essential elements of Modernism but never limited himself to one ideology. His furniture represented a convergence of historical design and 20th century innovation that greatly appeals to today's collectors.

Wormley's tables
Wormley's occasional tables for Dunbar include his tile-topped tables created as part of the Janus line in 1957 which were a partnership between Modern production design aesthetic and the tile traditions of Tiffany and Otto Natzler. Dining tables, stacking tables, and other occasional tables manufactured by Dunbar have been popular at auction but none have met with the success of these examples.

References

Further reading
 Marie FERRAN-WABBES, Wormley - Dunbar. Edward J Wormley (1907 - 1995). Design Director of Dunbar Furniture, translated from French by Caroline SUNDERLAND-DE MOUBRAY, Paris, 2017, 117 pp. 

American furniture designers
School of the Art Institute of Chicago alumni
1907 births
1995 deaths
People from Oswego, Illinois